Shaheed Motahhari High School is a college preparatory high school located in the heart of Tehran, Iran. It is named after the Ayatollah Morteza Motahhari Iranian scholar, cleric, University lecturer, and politician. Other names frequently used for the shahid motahhari high school are Motahari Prep School (previous name) and Motahhari High School.gvihogxotxpzxxojxz8fyozgdrd96dpuxpugxgu

History 
The school was founded as a University-preparatory school and had only one grade. after 2010 this school became a high school and it has grades 10-12.

External links
 Official Website

High schools in Iran
Schools in Tehran